Orthotylus digitus is a species of bug from the Miridae family that is endemic to France.

References 

Insects described in 1876
Endemic insects of Metropolitan France
Hemiptera of Europe
digitus